Harry Farjeon (6 May 1878 – 29 December 1948) was a British composer and an influential teacher of harmony and composition at the Royal Academy of Music for more than 45 years.

Early life and studies
Harry Farjeon was born in Hohokus Township, New Jersey, United States, the eldest son of author Benjamin Farjeon, who was from the East End of London, and Margaret, the daughter of American actor Joseph Jefferson. His parents returned to Britain when he was a baby, and he lived in Hampstead in London for the rest of his life. His younger sister, Eleanor Farjeon (b. 1881), with whom he shared a rich imaginary life, wrote children's books and poetry, including the hymn, Morning Has Broken. His younger brothers were J. Jefferson Farjeon (b. 1883), novelist, and Herbert Farjeon (b. 1887), writer of theatrical revues.

Harry studied music privately with Landon Ronald and John Storer, then in 1895 he entered the Royal Academy of Music in London, where he studied composition with Battison Haynes and Frederick Corder, and piano with Septimus Webbe. There he was a contemporary of Arnold Bax, York Bowen, Adam Carse, Eric Coates, Benjamin Dale and Percy Hilder Miles. An opera, Floretta, to a libretto by his sister, Eleanor, was produced at the Academy in 1899, and two operettas were performed at St George's Hall in 1901 and 1902.

Career in music
Farjeon left the Royal Academy of Music in 1900, but in 1901 he returned to teach composition. Two years later, at the age of 25, he became the Academy's youngest ever professor, having become the family wage-earner after the death of his father. Among his pupils were Mary Chandler, George Lloyd, Christian Darnton, Geraldine Mucha, Phyllis Tate, Daniel Jones and Steve Race. He also taught at the Blackheath Conservatoire.

Harry Farjeon composed music throughout most of his life. His compositions are mostly for piano (many grouped into suites and collections, some also published separately) with the illustrative pieces mostly intended to appeal to amateur home pianists. But he also wrote a piano sonata, chamber music (including four string quartets), full scale orchestral works and many separate songs, song cycles and dramatic works, often setting texts by his sister Eleanor. He also wrote about music for the Daily Telegraph, the Musical Times and other periodicals.

On 3 September 1903 his Piano Concerto in D minor was performed at the Proms. His Hans Andersen suite for small orchestra was played with great success at a Patron's Fund concert of the Royal College of Music in 1905, and also played by the Bournemouth Symphony Orchestra and elsewhere. The song cycle The Lute of Jade, which sets classical Chinese poetry from the popular translations by Launcelot Cranmer-Byng, was premiered in July 1917 by the Welsh mezzo-soprano and composer Morfydd Owen at the Birkenhead National Eisteddfod. His Phantasy Piano Concerto and the St. Dominic Mass were both published as part of the Carnegie Collection of British Music in 1925 and 1926 respectively, and both were frequently performed.

In 1937 Farjeon's close friend, the pianist Eileen Joyce, recorded the Tarantella in A minor in what became one of her most successful gramophone records. It seems likely that he composed it especially for Joyce and gave her the manuscript, as it wasn't published and doesn't appear in any catalogue entries. The Christmas Masque A Room at the Inn (written by Herbert and Eleanor Farjeon with music by Harry Farjeon) was broadcast five times between 1932 and 1945. And on 10 July 1942 his symphonic poem Pannychis (inspired by Eleanor Farjeon's short story of the same name) was played at The Proms, conducted by Basil Cameron. Farjeon regarded the symphonic poem Summer Vision as his best work, but the score was sent to Germany shortly before World War I and was lost.

His eyesight had been bad since childhood, and it grew worse as he became older. His students wrote their compositions on specially printed brown paper. Steve Race has said that writing on this paper cured him of writing long rambling compositions. Farjeon taught at the Academy for 47 years, despite developing Parkinson's disease in later life. He was still teaching thirty students a week when, at the end of the July 1948 term, he fell and broke his hip. He died in Hampstead on 29 December 1948.

Selected works 
Orchestral
 1903 - Characteristic Variations for orchestra
 1905 - Hans Andersen Suite for small orchestra
 1907 - Mowgli, symphonic poem
 1913 - Summer Vision, symphonic poem (score lost)
 1915 - The Ballet of the Trees for orchestra
 1929 - Caldicot Suite for orchestra
 1942 - Pannychis, symphonic poem
 Symphony in D major
 Elegy for strings
 Air on a Ground Bass for strings
 Pantomime, suite for strings

Concertante
 1903 - Piano Concerto in D minor
 1924-5 - Phantasy Piano Concerto (also version for 2 pianos) 
 1925? Idyll for oboe and orchestra (fp 7 January 1926, Bournemouth, soloist Leon Goossens) 

Chamber
 1901 - Two Romances for violin and piano (pub. Boosey)
 1906 - Chant d'Ete and Berceuse for violin and piano, Op.14 (pub. Augener)
 Suite for violin and piano Op. 20
 1911 - Deaux morceaux for viola and piano (pub. Schott) 
 1915 - Air for violins upon a ground bass for violin and piano, Op.38 (pub. Augener)
 1917 - Poem for violins and violas
 1925 - Three tone pictures for violin and piano, Op.57
 1925? - The Sleeping Beauty Op.60/2 for flute, cello and piano
 1927 - String Quartet No.4 in C major Op.65 (pub. W Paxton)
 1928 - Humoresque for cello and piano
 1928 Two Italian Sketches for piano duet (Recorded by Christopher Howell and Ermanno de Stefani)
 1931 Vignettes Op. 72 for two pianos
 Cello Sonata in G minor
 Cello Sonata in D
 Piano Trio in B minor
 Piano Trio in G minor
 String Quartet No.1 In G
 String Quartet No.2 in B flat
 String Quartet No.3
 Violin Sonata No.1
 Violin Sonata No.2 in F sharp minor
 Violin Sonata No.3 in E flat Op.69 (publ. Joseph Williams, 1931)

Opera and Dramatic
 1899 - Floretta (text by Eleanor Farjeon)
 1900 - The Registry Office, operetta
 1902 - A Gentleman of the Road, operetta in 1 act, Op. 6
 1932 - A Room at the Inn, Christmas Masque (with Herbert Farjeon and Eleanor Farjeon) 

Choral
 1923 - St Dominic Mass, Op. 51 
 1924 - Salvator Mundi (anthem)
 1925 - Down-adown-Derry for women's voices, flute and strings
 1925? - The Sleeping Beauty Op.60/1, choral ballad for female voices and piano (words Walter de la Mare)  Op.60/1
 Lament for women's choir

Piano
 1905 - Night Music Op. 11, piano suite, 7 pieces (pub. Augener) 
 1905 - Swan Song (pub. Augener) 
 1906 - Miniature Sonata Op. 12 (pub. Augener) 
 1906 - Pictures from Greece Op. 13, piano suite, 6 pieces (pub. Augener) 
 Two Bohemian Sketches, Op. 16
 1906 - The Four Winds Op. 18, piano suite, 4 pieces (pub. Augener) 
 1907 - Musical Sketch Book 4 pieces (pub. Augener) 
 Tone-Pictures Opp. 19, 23, 29 and 31, piano pieces, four volumes (pub. Augener)
 Three Venetian Idylls Op. 20 (pub. Augener). (Recorded by Christopher Howell) 
 A Summer Suite Op. 21, six pieces (pub. Augener)
 3 Moments Musicaux Op. 24 (pub. Augener)
 Aquarelles- Five idylls in Water Colour  Op. 25   (pub. Ricordi)
 1909? - Prelude From The Forest of Andaine Op. 27 (pub. Augener) 
 1910 - Two Idylls, Op. 28 (pub. Vincent) 
 From the Three-Cornered Kingdom Op.30, 6 pieces (pub. Augener) 
 Four Twilight Pieces Op. 34 (pub. Augener)
 1914 - Variations in A Op. 35, theme and 5 variations (pub. Augener)  
 Lyric Pieces, Op. 40
 1918 - Peter Pan Sketches Op. 44, piano suite, 5 pieces (pub. Newman) 
 1920 - Piano Sonata Op.43 (pub. Edwin Ashdown)
 1923 - The Art of Piano Pedalling 2 volumes
 1923 - Tunes Without Tales Op. 53, piano suite, 10 pieces 
 Two Free Fugues, Op 54
 1925 - Six Preludes, Op 56 
 1926 - Contrasts, suite
 1930 - Sports, suite
 1931 - The Art of Piano Phrasing, Op. 66
 1931 - Five Love Poems for Piano Op. 67
 1931 - Rhapsody for two pianos Op. 70
 193? - Tarantella in A minor (recorded by Eileen Joyce, 1937) 

Song Cycles
 1900 - Vagrant Songs for baritone and piano, Op. 26 (E.Farjeon)
 1906 - Three Toy Songs, (E.Farjeon)
 1908 - Child Songs, (E.Farjeon)
 1917 - The Lute of Jade 
 1924 - A Sussex Alphabet, (26 songs) 
 Peacock Pie (Walter de la Mare)

Further reading 
 Eleanor Farjeon: A Nursery in the Nineties (Gollancz, 1935) 
 Annabel Farjeon: Morning has broken: a biography of Eleanor Farjeon (Julia MacRae, 1986)
 Harry Farjeon: Musical Words Explained (OUP, 1933)
 "The Music of Harry Farjeon: A short survey of his work", in The Musical Mirror VII/6, London, 1927, p. 137

References

External links 

Harry Farjeon website
Herbert Farjeon archive at the University of Bristol Theatre Collection, University of Bristol
 Eileen Joyce plays Tarantella in A minor by Harry Farjeon
 Daniel Kasparian plays A Swan Song, 3 December, 2009
 Royal Academy of Music: Portrait of Harry Farjeon by William Townsend. Pencil drawing, 1946

1878 births
1948 deaths
British classical composers
British male classical composers
British Jews
20th-century classical composers
Alumni of the Royal Academy of Music
Jewish American classical composers
Harry
People from Bergen County, New Jersey
People from Hampstead
Musicians from London
Academics of the Royal Academy of Music
American emigrants to England
American people of English descent
American people of English-Jewish descent
American male classical composers
American classical composers
20th-century British composers
20th-century American composers
Classical musicians from New Jersey
20th-century American male musicians